Miguel Enríquez may refer to:

Miguel Enríquez (privateer), Puerto Rican merchant and privateer
Miguel Enríquez (politician), Chilean politician
Mike Enriquez, Filipino broadcast journalist

See also
Miguel Henríquez Guzmán